Kozan (Turkish name), formerly Sis, is a city in Adana Province, Turkey,  northeast of Adana, in the northern section of the Çukurova plain. The city is the capital of the ilçe (district) of Kozan. The Kilgen River, a tributary of the Ceyhan, flows through Kozan and crosses the plain south into the Mediterranean. The Taurus Mountains rise up sharply behind the town.

Sis was the capital of the Armenian Kingdom of Cilicia, today's Sis (ancient city), now called Kozan Kalesi, was built on a long rocky ridge in the center of the modern city.

The population of the city has grown rapidly in recent years, from 15,159 in 1960, to 54,451 in 1990, to 72,463 in 2007 and to 74,521 in 2009 (census figures).

Names
The oldest known name is Sis or Siskia. Under the Roman Empire, it was for a time named Flavias or Flaviopolis. The Greek version of the older name, Σίσιον Sision, came back into use in the later Byzantine period. In Armenian, it is called Sis Սիս or Sissu.

The name "Kozan" (Ottoman Turkish قوزان qōzān) comes from the Qōzānoğlu dynasty of derebeys (1689-1865), descendants of a tribe which originated in the village of Qōzān near Gaziantep.

Climate
Kozan has a hot-summer Mediterranean climate (Köppen climate classification Csa).

History
From 3000 BC onwards, there were Hittite settlements in all these plains behind the Mediterranean coast, based on farming and grazing animals.

Under the Roman Empire, it was Flavias or Flaviopolis in the Roman province of Cilicia Secunda.

Middle Ages
In 704, Sis was besieged by the Arabs, but relieved by the Byzantines. The Abbasid caliph al-Mutawakkil took it and refortified it, but it soon returned to Byzantine hands. It was rebuilt in 1186 by Leo II, king of the Armenian Kingdom of Cilicia, one of the Rupenide dynasty who made the city the capital of the Kingdom of Lesser Armenia (from 1186 till 1375). During the Crusade the catholicate returned to Sis in 1294, and remained there 150 years.

In 1266 Sis, the capital of the Armenian Kingdom of Cilicia, was captured and damaged by the Egyptian Mamluks led by Baibars. al-Said Barakah sent Qalawun to attack the city in 1277, but in 1375, Sis was taken and demolished by the Ramadanids, under the flag of the Mamluke Sultan of Egypt. The town never recovered its prosperity, not even when it passed into the power of the Ottomans in 1516. Sis became Kozan during overlordship of Kozanoğulları, a Kurdish clan between 1700 and 1866.

Ecclesiastical history

Sis had an important place in ecclesiastical history both the Armenian Apostolic Church and as a Roman Catholic titular see. It is first mentioned in Theodoret's life of St. Simeon Stylites.

In the Middle Ages, Sis was the religious center of Christian Armenians, until the Armenians moved the seat of Catholicos back to Vagharshapat (Echmiadzin), in Armenia. Lequien (II, 899) gives the names of several bishops of Sis, before and after Gregory IX.

Even prior to the Armenian Kingdom of Cilicia, Sis was an episcopal see and several names of bishops and patriarchs can be found in the literature:

Alexander, later Bishop of Jerusalem and founder of the famous library of the Holy Sepulchre in the third century
Nicetas, present at the First Council of Nicaea in 325
John, who lived in 451;
Andrew in the sixth century
George (681)
Eustratus, Patriarch of Antioch about 868

In 1441, Sis having fallen from its high estate, the Armenian clergy proposed to remove the see, and on the refusal of the Catholicos of the day, Gregory IX, installed a rival, namely Kirakos I Virapetsi (Kirakos of Armenia) at Echmiadzin, who, as soon as Selim I had conquered Greater Armenia, became the more widely accepted of the two by the Armenian church in the Ottoman Empire.

The Catholicos of Sis (of the Holy See of Cilicia) maintained himself nevertheless, with under his jurisdiction several bishops, numerous villages and convents,  when the patriarch Nerses, declaring finally for Echmiadzin, carried the government with him. In 1885, Sis tried to declare Echmiadzin schismatic, and in 1895 its clergy took it on themselves to elect a Catholicos; but the Porte annulled the election, and only allowed it six years later upon Sis renouncing its pretensions to independence. That Catholicos had the right to prepare the sacred myron (oil) and to preside over a synod, but was in fact not more than a metropolitan, and regarded by many Armenians as schismatic.

Ottoman period

In the Ottoman period, Kozan was in the sanjak of Adana, and the seat of the kaza of Kozan. Ottoman archives show that Devşirme system was implemented in Kozan. However there is evidence that the locals resisted the practise. In 1564, for example, villagers from Sis came to the Ottoman capital Istanbul and kidnapped their children back.

Modern

At the turn of the twentieth century, about 5,600 of its population of 8,000 were Armenians. They were all deported during the course of the Armenian genocide. Kozan was occupied by France between March 8, 1919 - June 2, 1920 during the Turkish War of Independence. After Turkey was declared a republic, Kozan was a province, compromising the districts of Kozan, Kadirli, Feke and Saimbeyli between 1923 and 1926.

Kozan today
Today Kozan is a city surrounded by vineyards, gardens and groves of cypress, sycamore fig, orange and lemon trees. In summer the great heat (40 plus degrees Celsius or 104 plus degrees Fahrenheit) compels the inhabitants to desert Kozan, retreating to cool off in the wooded higher ground.

Notable natives

 Nerses Balients (fl. early 14th century) - Armenian ecclesiastical figure, politician, historian
 Grigor Khul (12th century) - Armenian musician
 Manase Sevak (1897–1967) - Armenian biochemist and public figure, member of New York Academy of Sciences and Soviet Armenia's Academy of Sciences
 Grigor Kyulyan (1912–1974) - Armenian writer
 İmren Aykut (born 1940) Turkish female economist, trade unionist, politician and former government minister

Things to see
Today ruins of churches, convents, castles and palaces may be seen on all sides. The lofty castle and the monastery and church built by Leo II, and containing the coronation chair of the kings of Cilician Armenia, were still noteworthy up until the Armenian genocide.

Gallery

See also

Football Club of the town - Kozan Belediye Spor www.kozanspor.com

Notes

References

External links
 Armenian History and Presence in Sis
 Many pictures of the town and the castle

 
Cities in Turkey
Armenian Kingdom of Cilicia
Populated places in Adana Province
Districts of Adana Province